Isabel de Larrañaga Ramírez, H.C.S.C.J. (19 November 1836 - 17 January 1899) known as Isabel of the Heart of Jesus was a Filipino-Mestiza (mixed-race Spaniard) nun and foundress who is venerated in the Catholic Church. She was born in Manila, Philippines. Her cause for beatification is currently underway.

Life
Isabel de Larrañaga was born in Manila, Philippines, on 19 November 1836, to Juan Andrés Ma. de Larrañaga (the Military Governor of Manila at that time) and Isabel Ramírez Patiño. Her father was from Spain, and her mother was born of Spanish descent in Lima, Peru. She was the youngest of ten children. Her parents were Spanish and she was a Filipina by birth and by virtue of citizenship. She was baptized in San Miguel de Arcángel in Malacañan 30 days after her birth. 

After the death of her father in 1838, her mother returned to Spain with the children. Ramírez spent her childhood and early adolescence in Madrid and in Lima. Her mother ensured that Ramírez received a good education, learning music, painting, and languages (French, English, and Italian).

In 1855, Ramírez accompanied her mother and brother, Francisco Adrian, to Lima, Peru. There, the eighteen-year-old Ramírez became a teacher and engaged in charity work. She visited patients in hospitals, and became a catechist for children and young people. Seven years later, she and her mother went returned to Spain, and they resided in Madrid.

Death
In 1894 Ramírez sent a religious expedition to Cuba in spite of the delicate political situation during that time. During her second trip to Cuba, she suffered from heart problems which were aggravated with sufferings from the war, which eventually led to her death on 17 January 1899. She left a flourishing institute that, after her death, has extended on the following nations: Puerto Rico, Venezuela, Peru, and Chile.

Cause of beatification
On 17 December 1982 her beatification cause was formally opened by Pope John Paul II; thereby, bestowing upon her the title of "Servant of God Isabel Larrañaga Ramírez" ("Isabel of the Heart of Jesus"). Seventeen years later on 26 March 1999, Ramírez was elevated to venerable by Pope John Paul II.

References

Sources
 newsaints.faithweb website
 www.archimadrid.es

1836 births
1899 deaths
19th-century venerated Christians
19th-century Filipino Roman Catholic nuns
Founders of Catholic religious communities
Leaders of Catholic female orders and societies
People from Intramuros
Venerated Catholics by Pope John Paul II